Mount Mercy may refer to:

 Mount Arafat, a hill in Hejaz, Saudi Arabia (also known as "Mount of Mercy")
 Mount Mercy University, Cedar Rapids, Iowa, U.S.
 Mount Mercy College, Cork, Ireland
 Mount Mercy Academy (Buffalo, New York), U.S.

See also
 Mount Marcy (disambiguation)
 Mount Mary (disambiguation)
 Mount Mercer, Victoria, Australia
 Mount Mercer (Antarctica)